The talk about sex, often colloquially referred to as "the birds and the bees" or "the facts of life", is generally the occasion in most children's lives when their parents explain what sex is and how to do it.

According to tradition, "the birds and the bees" is a metaphorical story sometimes told to children in an attempt to explain the mechanics and results of sexual intercourse through reference to easily observed natural events. For instance, bees carry and deposit pollen into flowers, a visible and easy-to-explain parallel to the way a man brings about fertilisation. Female birds laying eggs is a similarly visible and easy-to-explain parallel to female ovulation.

Possible origins

Word sleuths William and Mary Morris hint that it may have been inspired by words like these from the poet Samuel Coleridge (1825): 'All nature seems at work ... The bees are stirring—birds are on the wing ... and I the while, the sole unbusy thing, not honey make, nor pair, nor build, nor sing.'"

Dr. Emma Frances Angell Drake (b. 1849) wrote a section of a publication called The Story of Life which was published in 1909. This piece was later picked up and included in Safe Counsel, a product of the Eugenics movement in the late 19th and early 20th century. The author tells her daughters "when you discovered the tiny blue eggs in the robin's nest and I told you that wrapped in each shell was a baby robin that was growing there, kept warm by the mamma bird..." the narrative continues on in vague terms without actually describing sexual intercourse. Later she describes the father's role in reproduction like this; "Sometimes it is the wind which blows the pollen dust from one plant to the other, and sometimes it is the bees gathering honey from the flowers. As they suck the honey from the blossoms some of the plant dust sticks to their legs and bodies, and as they go to another plant in search of sweets this is rubbed off and so the parts of the father and mother plant get together and the seed is made fertile." Safe Counsel was reprinted at least 40 times from 1893 through 1930 and may have been widely enough repeated to have contributed to the euphemism, "the birds and the bees."

Several sources give credit to Cole Porter for coining the phrase. One of the musician's more famous songs was "Let's Do It, Let's Fall in Love." In Porter's publication from 1928, the opening line for the chorus carried derogatory racial terms like "Chinks" and "Japs", which were later changed, sometime between 1941 and 1954, following CBS's recommendation and NBC's adoption of the new "birds and bees" lyric:

And that's why birds do it, bees do it
Even educated fleas do it
Let's do it, let's fall in love

In popular culture
 Many songs feature this phrase, or an extended version of it; "the birds and the bees and the flowers and the trees".
 In Six, a 2017 musical about the six wives of Henry VIII, Katherine Howard has a song about her various affairs titled "All You Wanna Do." In the chorus, she mentions "birds and the bees" as one of the things that different men want to do with her.
 John Burroughs, a naturalist who lived and worked in the Catskill Mountains, wrote a small pamphlet called "Birds and Bees: Essays" in which he explained the workings of nature in a way that children could understand.
 Robie Harris has written children's works such as It's Perfectly Normal: Changing Bodies, Growing Up, Sex, and Sexual Health (1994) and It's So Amazing: A Book About Eggs, Sperm, Birth, Babies, and Families (1999), which have been the center of controversy and book challenges in the United States.
 Jewel Akens earned one-hit wonder status with his Era Records single "The Birds and the Bees" in 1964, which reached #3 on the Billboard Hot 100. The song went on to hit the Top Ten in several European countries in 1965 and would later be covered by many other artists including Dean Martin and Brenda Lee.
 American indie pop musical duo from Los Angeles The Bird and the Bee take its name from the phrase.
 In The Dick Van Dyke Show 1965 episode entitled "Go Tell the Birds and the Bees", Rob and Laura are forced to meet with the school psychologist when school officials catch wind of their son's version of the "Birds and the Bees".
 In the opening of the episode "Parallel Universe" of the British sitcom Red Dwarf, a song called "Tongue Tied" is performed, which features the lyric "I saw you across the dance floor (dancing), I thought of birds and bees (reproductive system)".

See also
 Irreversible binomials
 Sex education
 Sexual reproduction

References

Euphemisms
Sex education
Metaphors referring to birds
Metaphors referring to insects